Bloom 06 was an Italian electronic music group, composed of two of the original three members of Eiffel 65. They have released two albums, Crash Test 01, Crash Test 02, and two remix EPs, Club Test 01 and Club Test 02. They have also released five singles.

The original group, Eiffel 65, reformed as of June 2010.

The formation of Bloom 06
Shortly after the departure of Gabry Ponte from Eiffel 65, due to a desire to begin a project of his own, Maurizio (Maury) Lobina (born on 1973 in Asti, Italy) and Gianfranco (Jeffrey) Randone officially announced, on 15 June 2005, that they had permanently  put the name Eiffel 65 behind them and they were ready to begin a new chapter in their artistic careers, releasing their current work under a new name which they had chosen as Bloom 06. The duo also confirmed that their debut album Crash Test 01 would be released on their brand new label Blue Boys, which would subsequently be distributed by Universal Italy in Fall of 2006. Through a press release published on a new web domain, Bloom 06 explained:

Members
Jeffrey Jey (real name Gianfranco Randone) – Born in Lentini, Sicily, on January 5, 1970 - lead vocals, bass.
Maury Lobina (old name Apollo, real name Maurizio Lobina) – Born in Asti, Piedmont, October 30, 1973 – keyboards, guitar, backing vocals.

Albums
Their first album, titled Crash Test 01, was released in October 2006. It contained 8 tracks, 5 in English and 3 in Italian. The tracks were composed over the course of 2½–3 years, though during the time that Jeffrey and Maury were still working under Eiffel 65. This album was originally intended to be Eiffel's fourth album, but it was thought to be too dark for the band which until then had been characterized as playing upbeat and happy dance music. This partly contributed to Jeffrey and Maury's departure from Bliss Corporation.

The band's second album is considered to be a 'second chapter' or 'second part' of Crash Test 01 and as such is entitled Crash Test 02. The album is said to contain lighter and more upbeat songs than the first. Crash Test 02 was originally scheduled have a much earlier release, but faced several delays, and was finally released on May 23, 2008.
Prior to the album's release, Bloom 06 released multiple previews of various songs from their album on their MySpace page. The first song was Between The Lines, on February 12, 2008. After strong response from their fans, 3 other previews were added, Anche Solo Per Un Attimo, Un'altra Come Te, and Welcome To The Zoo.

After an open vote from their fans, Bloom 06 reported on their MySpace that the first single released from Crash Test 02 will be "Un'altra Come Te". The single was released on iTunes on May 2, 2008., followed by the release of Crash Test 02 on May 23.

The album was released on Italian iTunes and in Italian stores.
On the 9 October, they announced that an EP of their recent songs from Crash Test 02 is going to be released by November 28, 2008. The EP also includes a remake of the hit song "Blue (Da Ba Dee)" from when they were Eiffel 65. A preview of the song was later posted on the Bloom 06 myspace website. On October 16, another preview was posted on their myspace. This preview is also another track from the new EP, Club Test 01, and is called "Being Not Like You" but a remixed track from the original song, and is the English version of the song "Un'altra Come Te".

On December 22, a new remix of "Welcome to the Zoo" was posted on the Bloom 06 Myspace site. It was said to be a full version of the song and was posted on the site before the song was released anywhere. On January 13, Bloom 06 posted a new remixed song called "Pop Porno" by Il Genio. Along with the news of their new remixed track, they've also posted new pictures from when they were on their new year exhibition in Pordenone.

On February 10, Bloom 06 posted a new featured song called "We Is The Power" by Alexia. As Jeffery said that they go way back with Alexia, they have also announced the process of making their third studio album that has yet to be officially previewed on the official Bloom 06 Myspace and official website. Another EP, Club Test 02 was released on 22 June on the Italian iTunes, United States iTunes and the Irish iTunes, and on 3 July on CD. The EP contains two new songs, Beats and Sweat in extended and radio forms, Dancing on the Moon in a radio form, a remake of Eiffel 65's 2000 hit song Move Your Body, and another remix of Welcome to the Zoo.

On June 17, 2010, Bloom 06 announced the reformation of Eiffel 65, to record a new album.

Discography

Albums
 Crash Test 01 (2006)
 Crash Test 02 (2008)

Singles
 "In the City" (2006)
 "Per Sempre" (2007)
 "The Crash" (promo) (2007)
 "Un'altra Come Te" (2008)
 "Being Not Like You" (2009)
 "Beats & Sweat" (2009)

EPs
 Club Test 01 (2008)
 Club Test 02 (2009)

Remixes
Vasco Rossi - "Basta Poco" (2007)
Zucchero - "Un Kilo" (2007)
Il Genio - "Pop Porno" (2009)
Pandora - "Kitchy Kitchy" (2009)

Collaborations
Alexia - "We Is the Power" (2009)

References

External links
 Official Bloom 06 Myspace

Italian Eurodance groups
Italian dance music groups
Italian musical duos
Electronic dance music duos
Male musical duos

hu:Bloom 06